Oelhoffen is a surname. Notable people with the surname include:

 David Oelhoffen (born 1968), French director and screenwriter
 Kimo von Oelhoffen (born 1971), American football defensive tackle